James Benner Jackson (November 28, 1877 – October 9, 1955) was a Major League Baseball outfielder. In 348 career games, he had a .235 batting average with 300 hits in 1274 at-bats. He batted and threw right-handed.

He attended the University of Pennsylvania.

Jackson was born and died in Philadelphia.

External links

1877 births
1955 deaths
Baltimore Orioles (1901–02) players
New York Giants (NL) players
Cleveland Naps players
Major League Baseball outfielders
Baseball players from Philadelphia
St. Paul Saints (AA) players
Columbus Senators players
Lima Cigarmakers players
Scranton Miners players
Wilmington Chicks players
Wichita Witches players
Colorado Springs Millionaires players